Harriet Nahwezhi-Bende (born 7 September 1994) is a Belgian basketball player for Rioja ISB and the Belgian national team.

She participated at the 2018 FIBA Women's Basketball World Cup.

References

External links

1994 births
Living people
Belgian expatriate basketball people in the United States
Belgian women's basketball players
Centers (basketball)
Oklahoma State Cowgirls basketball players
Basketball players from Kinshasa
21st-century Democratic Republic of the Congo people